Raphael "Raph" Jeffrey Carlisle Graybill (born February 20, 1989) is an American attorney who has served as chief legal counsel to Steve Bullock, the Governor of Montana, since 2017. Graybill was a candidate for attorney general of Montana in the 2020 general election.

Early life and education 
Graybill is a fifth-generation native of Montana. He was born and raised in Great Falls and graduated from Great Falls High School. In 2010, Graybill earned a Bachelor of Arts degree in political science from Columbia University. He then studied as a Rhodes Scholar at Magdalen College, Oxford, where he earned a Master of Philosophy (MPhil) degree in political theory in 2012. Graybill received a Juris Doctor from Yale Law School in 2015.

Graybill served as an auxiliary police officer with the New York City Police Department for four years while studying at Columbia University.

Career 
In 2008, Graybill was elected as a Democratic National Committee delegate and had the distinction of being the youngest DNC delegate elected to the Montana Delegation.

After graduating from Yale Law School in 2015, Graybill served as the law clerk to Chief Judge Sidney R. Thomas of the U.S. Court of Appeals for the 9th Circuit in Billings, Montana. He then worked in private practice for the firm Susman Godfrey LLP, representing small businesses harmed by unfair business practices.

Chief legal counsel to the governor 
In 2017, Montana Governor Steve Bullock appointed Graybill as chief legal counsel. As the lead attorney in the Montana Executive Branch, he represented the legal interests of the administration and its constituents. In this role, Graybill has represented cases in the Supreme Court of Montana and United States Supreme Court and set precedents in easements and public land access, veto powers, and election laws including mail in ballots and dark money disclosure requirements.

Notable cases:

 Lamm v. Bullock (U.S. Supreme Court / U.S. District Court)
 Espinoza v. Montana Department of Revenue (U.S. Supreme Court)
 Janus v. AFSCME (U.S. Supreme Court)
 Bullock v. Internal Revenue Service (U.S. District Court)
 Bullock v. Fox (Montana Supreme Court)
 Montana Smoke Free Association v. Bullock (Montana District Court)
 Bullock v. Stapleton (Montana District Court)

COVID-19 response 
As chief legal counsel, Graybill helped design Montana’s response to the COVID-19 pandemic in Montana. Graybill participated in drafting the governor’s executive orders, including No. 2-2020, that shaped new rules in the state designed to limit the spread of the virus. He also coordinated investigations and enforcement through the Montana Department of Health and Human Services.

Graybill was also charged with defending Montana's mail-in ballots for the November 3, 2020 election as part of the state's COVID-19 measures to protect voter and election worker safety during the pandemic. President Donald Trump's campaign brought a lawsuit against Montana Governor Bullock's mail-in ballot directive. Governor Bullock's directive allowed Montana counties to conduct elections using mail-in ballots if counties determined that in-person polling stations posed a significant public health risk. Graybill won the case for Montana in the U.S. District Court, and, when the Trump Campaign attempted to contest the decision in a petition to the U.S. Supreme Court, the Supreme court sided with Graybill and the State of Montana, which allowed counties to proceed with their plans to send out mail-in ballots.

2020 Montana attorney general campaign 
On May 8, 2019, Graybill announced his candidacy for Montana attorney general. Graybill won the June 2, 2020 Democratic primary, defeating state representative Kimberly Dudik. On November 3, 2020, Graybill lost the general election to Republican Austin Knudsen.

Personal life 
In December 2017, Graybill married Marisa Meredith Franklin, the Mathematics Instructional Coordinator at the Montana Office of Public Instruction. They have one daughter, Genevieve.

References 

Living people
1989 births
Politicians from Great Falls, Montana
Montana lawyers
Alumni of the University of Oxford
American Rhodes Scholars
Yale Law School alumni
Montana Democrats
Columbia College (New York) alumni